Joseph George Nelson (born October 25, 1974) is a former Major League Baseball relief pitcher.

High school
Nelson attended St. Joseph's High School in Alameda, California. At St. Joseph, Nelson played basketball with NBA star Jason Kidd.

College
After two seasons at Seminole State College from –-, he transferred to the University of San Francisco. In a switch to pitching at USF, he went undefeated, recording five saves.

Professional career

Atlanta Braves

Boston Red Sox
Released by the Braves the following summer, he was signed by the Boston Red Sox and quickly released after four appearances for Double-A Trenton. After recording a scoreless inning against Texas, he gave up 5 runs over 12⁄3 innings in his next two appearances. He was optioned back to Triple-A when Mark Malaska was activated off the disabled list.

New York Mets/Tampa Bay Rays/St. Louis Cardinals
Despite good peripheral numbers of 61 strikeouts in 46 innings and a .229 opponents' batting average, he went 0–3 with a 4.11 ERA and was released in July. Nelson then had a short 13-inning stint with the Cardinals' Double-A club, allowing just four hits over that span.

Kansas City Royals
He signed with the Kansas City Royals organization in November. Nelson bounced between Omaha and the major-league club before being called up for good on July 19, . After Royals closer Ambiorix Burgos was demoted on August 14, Nelson threw a perfect ninth inning the following day. Manager Buddy Bell used the 31-year-old journeyman in the closer's role for 2006. In , he was hurt. At the end of the 2007 season, he was designated for assignment to Triple-A Omaha, which he refused and opted out becoming a free agent.

Florida Marlins
In December 2007, Nelson was signed by the Florida Marlins to a minor league contract. Joe Nelson earned a victory over the Mets in his final appearance with the Marlins on September 28, 2008, becoming the last recorded winning pitcher at Shea Stadium. Nelson was non-tendered by the Marlins following the  season.

Second Stint with Rays
On December 30, 2008, Nelson signed with the Tampa Bay Rays. In October 2009 Nelson was granted free agency.

Second Stint with Red Sox
On February 1, 2010, Nelson signed a minor league contract with the Boston Red Sox. When Josh Beckett was placed on the disabled list on May 19, Nelson was called up to take his roster spot. He elected to become a free agent after he was designated for assignment by the Red Sox last week after opening the season with a 9.72 ERA over his first eight appearances.

Seattle Mariners
On June 24, 2010, Nelson signed a minor league contract with the Seattle Mariners, but was released on July 28, 2010.

Post Playing Career
After his active career, Nelson served as a professional scout for the Red Sox, based in West Palm Beach, Florida. In February 2017, the Chicago Cubs hired him as a scout.

References

External links

1974 births
Living people
Albuquerque Isotopes players
Atlanta Braves players
Baseball players from California
Boston Red Sox players
Boston Red Sox scouts
Chicago Cubs scouts
Durham Bulls players
Eugene Emeralds players
Florida Marlins players
Greenville Braves players
Gulf Coast Braves players
Jamestown Jammers players
Kansas City Royals players
Major League Baseball pitchers
Omaha Royals players
Pawtucket Red Sox players
Portland Sea Dogs players
Richmond Braves players
San Francisco Dons baseball players
Seattle Mariners scouts
Sportspeople from Chico, California
Springfield Cardinals players
Tacoma Rainiers players
Tampa Bay Rays players
Trenton Thunder players